Dirty Plotte is a comic book series by Julie Doucet, published by Drawn & Quarterly from 1991–1998.

Most of the oddball stories in Dirty Plotte were autobiographical, often about the struggles of being a woman and being an alternative cartoonist. Author Anne Elizabeth Moore summed up the comic this way:

Publication history 
Dirty Plotte began as a self-published photocopied zine used to record Doucet's "day to day life, her dreams, angsts, [and] fantasies." Doucet published 12 issues of the Dirty Plotte minicomic between 1988 and 1989.

It was only when Doucet was published in Robert Crumb's magazine, Weirdo, that she began to attract critical attention. Drawn & Quarterly (like Doucet, based in Montreal) began publishing Doucet in January 1991 in a regular sized comic series also named Dirty Plotte. Dirty Plotte was the first ongoing solo title published by Drawn & Quarterly.

Drawn & Quarterly published 4 issues of Dirty Plotte in 1991 (with much of the content being reprints of material that had appeared in the mini), but afterwards new issues were published once per year. Doucet played with the title of the series near the end, with individual issues called such things as Purty Plotte and Purity Plotte.

Many of the autobiographical stories from Dirty Plotte were collected in the trade paperback My New York Diary (Drawn & Quarterly, 1999), which won the 2000 Firecracker Award for best graphic novel.

Issues 
 Dirty Plotte (mini-comic) 12 issues between 1988 and 1989
 Dirty Plotte # 1 (January 1991)
 Dirty Plotte # 2 (March 1991)
 Dirty Plotte # 3 (July 1991)
 Dirty Plotte # 4 (October 1991)
 Dirty Plotte # 5 (May 1992)
 Dirty Plotte # 6 (January 1993)
 Dirty Plotte # 7 (September 1993)
 Dirty Plotte # 8 (February 1994)
 Dirty Plotte # 9 (April 1995)
 Dirty Plotte # 10 (December 1996)
 Dirty Plotte # 11 (September 1997)
 Dirty Plotte # 12 (August 1998)

Awards and honors 
In 1991, Dirty Plotte was nominated for the Harvey Award for Best New Series (Doucet won the Harvey for "Best New Talent"). In 1999, when The Comics Journal made a list of the top 100 comics of all time, Dirty Plotte ranked 96th.

See also

 List of feminist comic books
 Portrayal of women in comics

References

External links
 Dirty Plotte #1 at the Drawn & Quarterly website

1991 comics debuts
Canadian comics titles
Comics about women
Drawn & Quarterly titles
Feminist comics
Autobiographical comics